Qudsaya District is a district of the Rif Dimashq Governorate in southern Syria.

Qudsaya District is located to the northwest of the Damascus Governorate and Mount Qasioun, covering the northwestern outskirts of metropolitan Damascus. The administrative centre is the town of Qudsaya.

Until 2009, Qudsaya was a sub-district within Markaz Rif Dimashq District. In February 2009, the district of Qudsaya was formed, combining the former sub-district of Qudsaya with two sub-districts from the Zabadani District. At the 2004 census, these subdistricts had a total population of 105,974 people.

Sub-districts
The district of Qudsaya is divided into three sub-districts or nawāḥī. Population figures in the table are as of 2004.

Localities
According to the Central Bureau of Statistics (CBS), the villages, towns and cities in the following table make up the district of Qudsaya.

References

 
Districts of Rif Dimashq Governorate
2009 establishments in Syria